Nurizade Ziya Songülen (1886 Kadıköy, Istanbul – 1936) was a great-grandson of Damat Gürcü Halil Rifat Pasha and his second wife Saliha Sultan, an Ottoman princess. His parents was Azize Hanim and Hariciyeci Suad Bey. He was the founder and first president of the major Turkish multi-sport club Fenerbahçe SK, between 1907–08. Ziya Songülen also played as a right back for the club. He graduated from Saint Joseph's College and bought the ground where the current Şükrü Saracoğlu Stadium is located (then named Papazın Çayırı) for 17 Ottoman gold coins.

References

External links
Official website of Fenerbahçe SK
Fenerbahçe Kurucusu Ziya (Nurizade) Songülen’in hayatından kesitler. 

1936 deaths
19th-century people from the Ottoman Empire
Turkish footballers
Fenerbahçe S.K. footballers
Fenerbahçe S.K. presidents
1886 births
St. Joseph High School Istanbul alumni
Association football defenders
Burials at Aşiyan Asri Cemetery